Nina Zander (born 26 January 1990) is a German former professional tennis player.

Zander was born in Nuremberg. She won one singles title and two doubles titles on the ITF Women's Circuit in her career. On 18 August 2014, she reached her best singles ranking of world No. 279. On 16 February 2015, she peaked at No. 354 in the doubles rankings.

In June 2013, Zander made her WTA tour main draw debut at the Nürnberger Versicherungscup, partnering Laura Siegemund in doubles. They lost to Eva Hrdinová and María Irigoyen in the first round.

ITF finals (3–10)

Singles (1–6)

Doubles (2–4)

References

External links

 Official website 
 
 

1990 births
Living people
Sportspeople from Nuremberg
German female tennis players
Tennis people from Bavaria